Gabriele Debbia (born 20 January 1968 in Sassuolo) is a Italian former Grand Prix motorcycle road racer. His best year was in 1991 when he finished in fourth place in the 125cc world championship.

References 

1968 births
Living people
Sportspeople from the Province of Modena
Italian motorcycle racers
125cc World Championship riders
250cc World Championship riders
People from Sassuolo